Junction Seven is the seventh solo studio album by English musician and songwriter Steve Winwood, released in June 1997. The album broke the Top 40 in the UK but did not sell well in the US, and Winwood took a six-year break from making solo albums (returning in 2003 with About Time). This album was co-produced with Narada Michael Walden, while Winwood's wife Eugenia co-wrote several songs. Des'ree provided vocals on 'Plenty Lovin'.

Junction 7 is the nearest motorway junction to Winwood's childhood home, at Great Barr, Birmingham.

Track listing 

 "Spy in the House of Love"  (Winwood, Narada Michael Walden, Jim Capaldi) – 4:46
 "Angel of Mercy"  (Winwood, Walden, Capaldi) – 5:02
 "Just Wanna Have Some Fun"  (Winwood, Walden) – 4:57
 "Let Your Love Come Down"  (Winwood, Walden, Eugenia Winwood, Capaldi) – 5:48
 "Real Love"  (Winwood, Walden, Eugenia Winwood) – 5:21
 "Fill Me Up"  (Winwood, Eugenia Winwood) – 4:27
 "Gotta Get Back to My Baby"  (Winwood, Eugenia Winwood) – 4:52
 "Someone Like You"  (Winwood, Walden, Eugenia Winwood) – 4:39
 "Family Affair"  (Sylvester Stewart) – 5:17
 "Plenty Lovin'"  (Winwood, Walden) – 5:57
 "Lord of the Street"  (Winwood, Walden, Capaldi) – 5:26

Personnel 
 Steve Winwood – lead vocals, rhythm guitar (1, 10, 11), guitar solos (1), Wurlitzer electric piano (2), Hammond B3 organ (2, 3, 11), wah wah guitar solo (2), clavinet (3, 11), synth sax solo (3), organ (4), lead guitar (4), acoustic piano (5, 9, 11), acoustic guitar (6), additional keyboards (7), claves (7), horn arrangements (7), percussion (9)
 Michael McEvoy – additional keyboards (1, 2, 5), voice (2), synth vibes (4), additional acoustic piano (4), bass (5, 6), keyboards (6, 8), dobro (6), drum programming (6, 8), synth strings (8, 10), bass programming (8)
 Narada Michael Walden – keyboards (1, 3, 5, 8–10),  bass (1, 3, 8), drums (1, 9, 11), drum programming (1–6, 8, 9, 11), Hammond B3 bass (2), percussion (2, 3, 5, 9, 11), synthesizers (3, 11), organ (4), cymbals (8), synth bass (9)
 Frank Martin – keyboards (3-5, 11), programming (3–5, 11), bass (5)
 Rebeca Mauleón-Santana – acoustic piano (7), horn arrangements (7)
 Jimi Fischer – wah wah guitar (1), additional drum programming (2), additional acoustic piano (4), additional bass (4)
 Vernon "Ice" Black – guitar (3)
 Lenny Kravitz – guitar (4)
 Nile Rodgers – guitar (9)
 José Neto – acoustic guitar, nylon electric guitar (10), guitar solo (10)
 Marc Van Wageningen – bass (7)
 Myron Dove – electric bass (9)
  Gary Brown – electric bass (10)
 Gigi Gonaway – percussion (1), MIDI drums (11)
 Walfredo Reyes Jr. – percussion (3, 4, 7, 11), drums (7)
 Walfredo Reyes Sr. – percussion (7), timbales (7)
 Daniel Reyes – congas (7)
 Jerry Hey – string arrangements and conductor (2, 5, 9), trumpet (3, 4), horn arrangements (3, 4)
 Nathan Rubin – concertmaster (2, 5, 9)
 Marc Russo – saxophone (3, 4)
 Melecio Magdaluyo – saxophone (7)
 Wayne Wallace – trombone (3, 4)
 Jeff Cressman – trombone (7)
 Louis Fasman – trumpet (7)
 Bill Ortiz – trumpet (7)
 Nikita Germaine – backing vocals (1–4, 7, 9, 11)
 Tina Gibson – backing vocals (1–4, 7, 9, 11)
 Skyler Jett – backing vocals (1–3, 7, 9, 11)
 Tony Lindsey – backing vocals  (1–3, 7, 9)
 Annie Stocking – backing vocals (1–4, 7, 9, 11)
 Sandy Griffith – backing vocals (4, 8)
 Claytoven Richardson – backing vocals (4, 8)
 Simone Sauphanor – backing vocals (6, 7)
 Ruby Turner – backing vocals (6, 7)
 Eugenia Winwood – spoken word (6)
 Des'ree – lead vocals (10)

Party People on "Gotta Get Back To My Baby"
 Nikita Germaine, Tina Gibson, Skyler Jett, Tony Lindsey and Annie Stocking

Production 
 Produced and arranged by Steve Winwood and Narada Michael Walden.
 Production administrator – Tony DeFranco
 Production coordinators – Janice Lee, Cherice Miller, Shiloh Hobel and Kulan Kevin Walden.
 Recorded and mixed by David Frazer
 Second engineer – Mick Dolan
 MIDI and assistant engineer on Tracks 1–4, 7 & 11 – Jeff Gray
 Additional engineers – Marc "Elvis" Reyburn (Tracks 3 & 9); Jim Labinski (Track 4); Gary Tole (Track 9).
 Recorded at Netherturkdonic Studios (Turkdean, Gloucestershire, UK) and Tarpan Studios (San Raphael, California, US).
 Studio Assistant at Netherturkdonic Studios – Andy Davies
 Track 4 recorded at Le Crib (New York, NY).
 Track 9 recorded at A&M Studios (Los Angeles, CA).
 Mixed at Netherturkdonic Studios 
 Mastered by Ted Jensen at Sterling Sound (New York, NY).
 Creative Director and Project Manager – Eugenia Winwood
 Photography – Annie Leibovitz
 Personal Assistant to Steve Winwood – Viv Phillips
 Management – Mick Newton and Ron Weisner

References

Steve Winwood albums
1997 albums
Albums produced by Narada Michael Walden
Virgin Records albums
Albums produced by Steve Winwood
Great Barr